Victor Lobo Escolar (born November 19, 1979) is a Spanish biathlete.  He competed at the 2014 Winter Olympic Games in Sochi, in sprint and individual.

Olympic results

External links

Victor Lobo Escolar at IBU

References

1979 births
Living people
Biathletes at the 2014 Winter Olympics
Olympic biathletes of Spain
Sportspeople from Zaragoza
Spanish male biathletes
University of Lleida alumni